Westfield Liverpool is a major shopping centre, located in Liverpool, a suburb of Sydney.

History and development
Westfield Liverpool was opened in 1971.

The centre has a current trade area population of 614,000 people, with 14.9 million annual customer visits. The total annual retail sales at the centre were 515.5 million.

Redevelopments
The centre has been extended and redeveloped three times in its life, the first in 1991, again in 1993, and more recently in 2006. By its 1993 extension, the centre was jointly owned by Westfield and Rodamco, and had  of GLA. These extensions were valued at an estimated $200 million (2006). In 2011, another redevelopment occurred in the shopping centre which included widening of the mall, new flooring, lighting and furniture, as well as the relocation of existing retailers.

Transport
The centre can be accessed by multiple transport options, including public bus, and is within walking distance of Liverpool railway station.

Image gallery

References

Westfield Group
Shopping centres in Sydney
Shopping malls established in 1971
1971 establishments in Australia